Paris is a ghost town in Lincoln County, Kansas, United States.

History
Paris was issued a post office in 1878. The post office was discontinued in 1898.

References

Former populated places in Lincoln County, Kansas
Former populated places in Kansas